The Rock Flat Mine lies in the drainage of the Rock Flat Placer through the Little Goose Creek Canyon. It is a small placer mine in central Idaho. it primarily produces gold, corundum, spinel, and topaz.

See also
Little Goose Creek Canyon
Rock Flat Placer

References 

Geology
Geology of Idaho
Mining in Idaho
Mines in Idaho
Natural history of Idaho
Adams County, Idaho